The Stratosphere Giant was once considered the tallest tree in the world. It was discovered in July 2000 growing along Bull Creek in Humboldt Redwoods State Park by Chris Atkins, measuring 112.34 meters (368.6 ft) tall. The discovery was confirmed and made public in 2004, displacing the Mendocino Tree, another coast redwood, from the record books. The tree has continued to grow and measured 113.11 m (371.1 ft) in 2010. It is a specimen of the species Sequoia sempervirens, the Coast Redwood. The tree features three prominent burls on the southwestern side of its trunk and is surrounded by a large number of trees of almost equal size. In an effort to avoid damage to the tree's shallow roots by tourism, its exact location was never disclosed to the public.

On August 25, 2006, a taller redwood tree, named Hyperion, in the Redwood National Park was discovered by Chris Atkins and Michael Taylor, and is considered the tallest tree (and living thing), measuring 115.55 m (379.1 ft). This has been confirmed using a tape measurement. Two other trees in this forest were found to be taller than Stratosphere Giant as well.

See also
Sequoia—Statistics section
Orders of magnitude (length)
List of individual trees

References

External links
Gymnosperm Database
Photo gallery with meteorology and plant physiology sensors installed

Individual coast redwood trees
Natural history of Humboldt County, California
Natural history of the California Coast Ranges